Can-Am Bandy Cup is the name of an annually recurring friendly bandy match played between the Canadian and the American national bandy teams.

References

Bandy in Canada
International bandy competitions hosted by the United States